In military terms, 95th Division or 95th Infantry Division may refer to:

 95th Division (People's Republic of China)
 95th Infantry Division (German Empire)
 95th Infantry Division (Wehrmacht)
 95th Rifle Division (Soviet Union)
 U.S. 95th Infantry Division

See also
 95th Squadron (disambiguation)